Zarechensky is a rural locality (a settlement) in Alexandrovskoye Rural Settlement, Talovsky District, Voronezh Oblast, Russia. The population was 92 as of 2010.

Geography 
Zarechensky is located on the right bank of the Sukhaya Chigla River, 12 km northeast of Talovaya (the district's administrative centre) by road. Novotroitsky is the nearest rural locality.

References 

Rural localities in Talovsky District